Albert Kanta Kambala (25 May 1958 – 10 July 2008) was a Zaire international footballer, who played as a midfielder.

Club career
Born in Élisabethville (now Lubumbashi, Democratic Republic of the Congo) Kanta Kambala began his career with TP Mazembe. He moved to play in the Greek first division at the age of 23, signing with Rodos F.C. for two seasons. He would finish his playing career in Belgium and receive his UEFA Pro License from the school in Heysel.

Managerial career
He managed several football clubs in Democratic Republic of the Congo, including Daring Club Motema Pembe, AS Vita Club, AS Dragons, SC Cilu, AS Kabasha, OC Bukavu Dawa and FC Makila Mabe.

Death
Kanta Kambala died at a hospital in Kikwit at age 50.

References

1958 births
2008 deaths
People from Lubumbashi
Democratic Republic of the Congo footballers
Democratic Republic of the Congo expatriate footballers
Democratic Republic of the Congo international footballers
Democratic Republic of the Congo football managers
TP Mazembe players
Rodos F.C. players
Expatriate footballers in Greece
Super League Greece players
Association football midfielders
21st-century Democratic Republic of the Congo people